The Affiliated Jhongli Senior High School of National Central University is a public high school, which is located in Zhongli District, Taoyuan City, Taiwan. National Jhongli Senior High School was previously a Japanese Temple built in October 1939. After KMT migrated to Taiwan, the temple was abolished and became a local senior high school.

School Anthem
我們的祖先遠渡海洋，流血流汗拓土開荒；

我們的寶島建設輝煌，自由燈塔民主津梁。

中壢！中壢！沃野高岡；

壢中！壢中！巍峨宮牆。

樂育英才春風飄蕩，復興文化歷史綿長。

我們要盡忠尚義耐勞崇禮；我們要堅苦卓絕莊敬自強；

我們要努力努力校譽宏揚；我們要奮鬥奮鬥為國爭光。

See also
 Education in Taiwan

External links

 National Jhongli Senior High School Official website

High schools in Taiwan
Zhongli District